Roccaromana is a comune (municipality) in the Province of Caserta in the Italian region Campania, located about  north of Naples and about  northwest of Caserta.

People
Antonio Senese, poet

References

Cities and towns in Campania